

Gerhard Limberg (7 July 1920   –  23 March 2006) was a general in the Air Force of West Germany. He was Inspector of the Air Force, the senior air force appointment, from 1974 to 1978.

Awards
 German Cross in Gold on 20 March 1944 as Leutnant in the III./Schlachtgeschwader 4

References

Citations

Bibliography

External links
Der Spiegel - Gerhard Limberg (German)

1920 births
2006 deaths
German Air Force pilots
Recipients of the Gold German Cross
Commanders Crosses of the Order of Merit of the Federal Republic of Germany
Bundeswehr generals
Lieutenant generals of the German Air Force